The 1976–77 Football League Cup was the 17th season of the Football League Cup, a knockout competition for England's top 92 football clubs. The competition started on 14 August 1976 and ended with the final going to a second replay on 13 April 1977.

The final was contested by First Division teams Aston Villa and Everton at Wembley Stadium in London, followed by replays at Hillsborough and finally being decided at Old Trafford.

First round

First Leg

Second Leg

Replays

Second round

Ties

Replays

Third round

Ties

Replays

2nd Replays

Fourth round

Ties

Replays

Fifth Round

Ties

Semi-finals

First Leg

Second Leg

Replay

Final

First Replay

Second Replay

References

General

Specific

1969-70
1976–77 domestic association football cups
Lea
Cup